Gedling and Carlton railway station was a former railway station built to serve the villages of Gedling and Carlton in Nottinghamshire.

History 
It was opened by the Great Northern Railway (Great Britain) on its Derbyshire Extension in 1875–6. It was on the climb from the junction at Colwick with the Ambergate, Nottingham, Boston and Eastern Junction Railway into Nottingham London Road.

From Gedling and Carlton, the line climbed through Mapperley Tunnel between the Trent and Leen valleys, reaching the first summit of the line at Arno Vale.

Mapperley Tunnel was extremely unstable due to mining subsidence and the heavy traffic through it. In 1925 part of the roof collapsed, blocking the line, and this was part of the reason that this section of line closed prematurely.

In December 1956 in thick fog, a goods train struck Paul Potter, aged 10, who was crossing the track. The train passed over him and he survived with only minor injuries 

Gedling station closed in 1960.

Stationmasters

Joseph Gibson ca. 1876
John Bott ca. 1877
George Wilson ca. 1880 ca. 1881
John Brook ca. 1883 ca. 1885
George Baker ca. 1888
Richard Maddison 1889 - 1901 
John Smedley ca. 1902
Benjamin William Stocks 1903 - 1920 
Frederick Joseph Wilson ca. 1922 ca. 1925
C.S. Barnard ca. 1950
Sam S. Scott (formerly station master at Pye Hall, afterwards station master at Swinton)

Present day 
The original station building is currently owned by a youth group

References

Disused railway stations in Nottinghamshire
Railway stations in Great Britain opened in 1876
Railway stations in Great Britain closed in 1960
Former Great Northern Railway stations
Gedling